Jung Jin-young (born October 16, 1964) is a South Korean actor. He has starred in numerous films, including Hi! Dharma!, Bunt, and The Case of Itaewon Homicide. Jung is best known for his frequent collaborations with director Lee Joon-ik, as Once Upon a Time in a Battlefield and its sequel Battlefield Heroes, The Happy Life, Sunny, and particularly for his role as King Yeonsan in the hugely successful King and the Clown.

Jung also appeared in the television series The Kingdom of The Winds, Dong Yi, Brain, and Love Rain.

Filmography

Book
꼬마삼총사 하롱하롱 탐험대 (1990)

Awards and nominations

References

External links

 
 
 

20th-century South Korean male actors
21st-century South Korean male actors
South Korean male film actors
South Korean male stage actors
South Korean male television actors
South Korean television presenters
Male actors from Seoul
1964 births
Living people